Firin' Up is the eighth studio album by American country rock band Pure Prairie League, released in 1980 (see 1980 in music) on their new label Casablanca. "Let Me Love You Tonight" is the band's biggest pop hit, peaking at number 10 on the Billboard singles chart.

Track listing
All tracks composed by Vince Gill; except where indicated
"I'm Almost Ready" - 3:39
"Give It Up" (Werner Fritzching, Doug Lubahn) - 3:54
"Too Many Heartaches in Paradise" (Dan Greer, Jeff Wilson) - 4:02
"She's All Mine" - 2:44
"You're My True Love" - 3:10
"Let Me Love You Tonight" (Dan Greer, Jeff Wilson, Steve Woodard) - 2:43
"I Can't Stop This Feelin'" (Danny Flower, Jim Sanderfur) - 3:34
"Lifetime of Nighttime" - 4:54
"I'll Be Damned" - 2:42
"Janny Lou" - 4:24

Personnel

Pure Prairie League
Vince Gill - banjo, fiddle, guitar, violin, vocals
Michael Reilly - bass, vocals
Jeff Wilson - guitar, vocals
Michael Connor - keyboards
Billy Hinds - drums

Additional personnel

Kristine Arnold - background vocals on "I'll Be Damned"
Janis Gill - background vocals on "I'll Be Damned"
Gary Mielke - synthesizer
David Sanborn - alto saxophone

Production
Producer - John Ryan
Engineer - Bill Drescher
Arranger, orchestrator - David Campbell

Charts
Album - Billboard (United States)

Singles - Billboard (United States)

Trivia
"Let Me Love You Tonight" was featured in the Drawn Together episode "Requiem for a Reality Show".

References

Pure Prairie League albums
1980 albums
Albums arranged by David Campbell (composer)
Casablanca Records albums
Albums recorded at Sound City Studios